Stacy Prammanasudh (born September 23, 1979) is a retired American professional golfer who played on the LPGA Tour from 2004 to 2013.

Amateur career
Prammanasudh was born in Enid, Oklahoma, to an American mother and a native Thai father who immigrated to the United States from Thailand. She was raised in Oklahoma, and attended the University of Tulsa where she won the Stanford Pepsi Intercollegiate from 1999 to 2001 and was a three-year Academic All-American, from 2000 through 2002. Prammanasudh was also a First-Team All-American from 1999 through 2002. She was the recipient of the Edith Cummings Munson Golf Award in 2001, which is given to one of the top female collegiate golfers who excels in academics. She finished her senior season ranked second in the nation and won 10 collegiate events throughout her college career. This is the second-most in the school's history, behind only Nancy Lopez's 11 titles.

Professional career
After graduating from college in June 2002, Prammanasudh joined the Futures Tour. In the fall of 2002, she competed in the LPGA Qualifying School, finishing tied for 24th, which earned her non-exempt status on the LPGA Tour for 2003. Competing on both the Futures Tour and LPGA Tour in 2003, Prammanasudh won two Futures events and finished in the top-10 in nine other events. She won the Futures Tour Player of the Year award, which earned her fully exempt status on the LPGA for 2004.

Her first win on the LPGA Tour came in 2005 at the Franklin American Mortgage Championship.

Until 2007, Prammanasudh's father, Pravat "Lou" Prammanasudh, a native of Thailand, served as her caddie. He retired in 2007 and her husband Pete Upton caddied for her until her retirement in 2013.

Professional wins (4)

Futures Tour (2)
2003 (2) Frye Chevrolet Classic, Lincoln Financial Futures Golf Classic

LPGA Tour (2)

Results in LPGA majors

^ The Evian Championship was added as a major in 2013.

CUT = missed the half-way cut
WD = withdrew
"T" = tied

Summary

Most consecutive cuts made – 5 (2009 LPGA – 2010 LPGA)
Longest streak of top-10s – 1 (twice)

Team appearances
Professional
Solheim Cup (representing the United States): 2007 (winners)
Lexus Cup (representing International team): 2006, 2007

References

External links

American female golfers
Tulsa Golden Hurricane women's golfers
LPGA Tour golfers
Solheim Cup competitors for the United States
Golfers from Oklahoma
American sportspeople of Thai descent
Sportspeople from Enid, Oklahoma
Sportspeople from Tulsa, Oklahoma
Enid High School alumni
1979 births
Living people